MS Seatruck Pace is a ro-ro freight ferry operated by Seatruck Ferries. Built by Spanish shipyard Astilleros de Huelva, Seatruck Pace entered service In March 2009 on the Liverpool - Dublin route, named Clipper Pace.

History

Seatruck Pace is the third of four new ships for Seatruck. Her service speed of over  enabled crossing times between Liverpool and Dublin to be reduced to six hours. Older ships like the Riverdance and Moondance took nine and a half hours to do the same journey.

In February 2012, the vessel was renamed Seatruck Pace. In May 2012 Seatruck Pace was chartered to DFDS and deployed on the Rosyth - Zeebrugge route.

Description
Seatruck Pace is one of four "P Series" ro-ro freight ferries. Det Norske Veritas class the vessel as a 1A1 General Cargo Carrier - with whom Seatruck Pace is allocated the number 26468.

The vessel is designed to fit in Heysham harbour ("Heysham max"). Trailers are carried over three decks.

The vessel is powered by two Wärtsilä 8L46D, 9240 kW each, diesel engines which drive two propellers. The vessel is also equipped with two Wärtsilä CT200 bow thrusters.

Sister Vessels
Clipper Pennant
Clipper Panorama
Clipper Point

References

External links

 Seatruck Ferries

Ships of Seatruck Ferries
Ferries of the United Kingdom
Merchant ships of Cyprus
2007 ships
Ships built in Spain